Pesnica is a dispersed settlement in the hills south of Jurij ob Pesnici in the Municipality of Kungota in the western part of the Slovene Hills in northeastern Slovenia, right on the border with Austria.

References

External links
Pesnica on Geopedia

Populated places in the Municipality of Kungota